Our Home may refer to:
Our Home (store), a Filipino retailing chain
"Our Home", a song by Brett Kissel from the 2023 album The Compass Project
Nosso Lar (Portuguese for "Our Home"), a best-selling novel by the Brazilian spiritist medium Francisco Cândido Xavier
Nosso Lar (film), a 2010 Brazilian drama film based on the book
 Meie Kodu (Estonian for "Our Home"), a weekly Estonian language newspaper published in Sydney, New South Wales, Australia, between 1949 and 1954

Political parties
 Yisrael Beiteinu, a nationalist political party in Israel
 Our Home – Russia (NDP), a Russian political party between 1995 and early 2000
 Ukraine is Our Home, a Ukrainian political party